Si vas para Chile is a waltz composed by the Chilean musician Chito Faró in 1942. This song is one of the most popular songs in Chilean music and it has been covered by many artists, including Los Huasos Quincheros and Los Cuatro Cuartos.

The song takes the form of a conversation between a Chilean living abroad and a person who is going to visit Chile. The Chilean asks the traveler to visit the woman he loves to express his feelings from afar. He gives directions to arrive at his beloved's home, describing in the process characteristics of Chile's Central Valley: willows alongside streams, the Andes mountain range and the townspeople.

The closing line of the song is one of the most recorded in Chilean popular music: "In Chile, you'll see how well they treat friends from abroad." ("Y verás como quieren en Chile al amigo cuando es forastero"). This line is often cited to highlight Chilean's friendliness towards foreigners and immigrants.

The lyrics describe a small town called Las Condes, which in the time the song was written was an agricultural area to the east of de Santiago, Chile. As the years have passed, this small town has been urbanized and is now part of the metropolitan area of Santiago. It is now an important center for finance known by some as Sanhattan.

However, "Si vas para Chile" was composed by Chito Faró during his time in en Buenos Aires, Argentina. Originally the song mentioned the town of Los Andes, where the composer had spent many years. Faró tried to sell the song to authorities in Los Andes, but they rejected his offer. Through an agreement with Raúl Matas, Faró changed the name of the town in the song from Los Andes to Las Condes.

External links
Letra de «Si vas para Chile» en Nuestro.cl
Editorial de El Mercurio (18/09/07)
«Si vas para Chile» en Letralia

Waltzes
1942 songs
Songs about Chile
Songs of World War II
National symbols of Chile